The National Organization of Black Women in Law Enforcement, Inc. (NOBWLE) is a United States non-profit organization devoted to furthering the hiring, training, retention, and promotion of females in law enforcement. The organization promotes a spirit of professionalism by preparing women through education and training to keep abreast of current theories and techniques. It is headquartered in Fort Washington, MD, and have chapters in Maryland, Pittsburgh, Philadelphia and Newark. The organization holds training conferences throughout the year.

NOBWLE was founded in 1985 by Special Agent Gladys Jones and several others from the Washington, DC Metropolitan area, to give women a network and a voice within their profession. NOBWLE seeks both women and men to help mentor women in the law enforcement community, to give back NOWBLE members' children, to help support families with needs, and to continue being strong role models in order to lift each other up.

See also
 National Organization of Black Law Enforcement Executives

References

Founding member retires

African-American professional organizations
Law enforcement non-governmental organizations in the United States
Organizations established in 1985
Women's occupational organizations
African-American women's organizations
Women's organizations based in the United States
1985 establishments in Maryland